Paul Lawrence Fuemana (8 February 1969 – 31 January 2010) was a New Zealand singer, songwriter and musician from Auckland. One of the first globally successful pioneers of his country's unique style of hip-hop, Fuemana was one of New Zealand's greatest popular music icons of the 1990s. 

Born in Otara, South Auckland, to a Niuean father and a Māori mother, Pauly had a difficult, poverty-stricken childhood, where his only real enjoyment came from making music with his brothers. Speaking Niuean as his first language, he saw the world in a uniquely Polynesian way, and made music accordingly. Leading the rap trio and then joint music project, the Otara Millionaires Club (abbreviated to OMC) his 1996 debut album How Bizarre and its eponymous lead single became a huge success across the world. The name OMC was ironic, as its namesake of his home of Otara was one of the poorest communities in the whole of the large island nation. Along with his brother Phil Fuemana, Pauly cultivated the unique South Auckland musical genre of Urban Pasifika, bringing it to worldwide commercial and critical acclaim. 

Fuemana was often considered a one-hit wonder because of the unequalled success of "How Bizarre", which overshadowed his other, relatively successful work, such as the singles "On the Run", "Never Coming Back" and "Land of Plenty". In a 1997 interview, he reflected on what was once a witticism to himself and his home – an "Otara millionaire" – now represented his reality. Shortly after his rise to fame, OMC was put on indefinite hiatus due to disputes with his US record label. In 1998, he was also involved in a lawsuit filed by his producer and co-writer Alan Jansson over royalties due to Jansson. It was settled in arbitration. Fuemana focused on his wife Kristine and six children, but grew sick during the mid 2000s; by the end of the decade, he had been diagnosed with chronic inflammatory demyelinating polyneuropathy, an extremely rare neurological disorder similar to multiple sclerosis. Fuemana kept his illness private. He died in 2010, a week before his 41st birthday. Posthumously, his music has found success on TikTok.

Early life 
Fuemana was born in Auckland, to parents Takiula Fuemana and Olivia Hohaia. He was of half-Niuean and half-Māori descent. His father, Takiula Fuemana, is originally from Mutalau, Niue, before emigrating to New Zealand, while his mother was Taranaki Māori. Fuemana was the youngest of four children.

Fuemana was raised in Otara, a poor suburb in South Auckland with a large Pacific Islander population.

OMC 
Otara Millionaires Club was formed by older brother Phil Fuemana and was passed on to Pauly Fuemana. The name was ironic or tongue in cheek, as the Otara neighborhood was one of Auckland's poorest communities. Pauly later shortened the band's name to OMC, forming a musical partnership with Alan Jansson (as OMC) who co-wrote and produced the How Bizarre album. Signed to Auckland independent label Huh Records by Simon Grigg, OMC reached worldwide fame in 1996 and 1997 with the single "How Bizarre", from their debut album of the same name. OMC and Alan Jansson, ceased recording in 1998, but recorded again in 2005 to 2007. Recording "4 all of us" a single that featured Lucy Lawless, Fuemana's portion of the royalties was donated to the Race Relations Commission. 

How Bizarre, which was named Single of the Year at the 1996 New Zealand Music Awards, hit number one around the world, including the United States, Australia, Austria, Canada, Ireland and New Zealand. In 2002, their song "How Bizarre" reached No. 71 on the 100 Greatest One-hit Wonders. The single was a chart hit in many countries and spent multiple weeks at number one in several countries, reaching the top for two weeks in Austria, three weeks in Ireland, three weeks in New Zealand and five weeks in Australia. 

He often spoke about the hit: "I put a lot of hidden stories in there so people could read between the lines and sense it for what it is instead of telling them, 'Yeah, we got pulled over by the cops, and my mate got his head smashed in, and we got arrested, and they found some pot on him,'" Fuemana told Reuters in a 1997 interview.

Fuemana declared bankruptcy in 2006.

How Bizarre is still played worldwide 25 years after its release. More than a million copies of the How Bizarre album were sold.  It is one of the most successful songs recorded in New Zealand. OMC was voted #34 on the APRA Top 100 New Zealand Songs of All Time.

Death 
Fuemana died following a protracted battle with chronic inflammatory demyelinating polyneuropathy, ultimately succumbing to respiratory failure at North Shore Hospital, North Shore City, on 31 January 2010. His death occurred eight days before his 41st birthday. He had been in declining health for several years. For a few months prior to his death he had been suffering from a neurological condition and also developed pneumonia.

He is survived by his wife, Kirstine Fuemana, a New Zealand woman whom he'd met in 1993 and married in 2002, and his six children. 

Fuemana's funeral was held on 5 February 2010, at the Pacific Island Presbyterian Church in Newton, New Zealand. The 200 attendees included rappers Dei Hamo, Ermehn and Darryl Thompson (also known as DLT), Alan Jansson, Simon Grigg, Nathan Haines and the mayor of Auckland Super city, Len Brown.

References

External links
AudioCulture profile
Huh Records
RIP PaulyFuemana on Facebook
Sunday Star Times: Fuemana: the money, the violence, the drugs
Stuff.co.nz: Pauly Fuemana – The Real Story

1969 births
2010 deaths
APRA Award winners
New Zealand people of Niuean descent
New Zealand Māori musicians
New Zealand pop singers
New Zealand male singer-songwriters
People from Auckland
Taranaki (iwi)
Deaths from respiratory failure
Deaths from autoimmune disease